Scheuder is a village and a former municipality in the district of Anhalt-Bitterfeld, in Saxony-Anhalt, Germany. On 1 January 2010, it joined several other municipalities to form the town Südliches Anhalt.

References 

Former municipalities in Saxony-Anhalt
Südliches Anhalt
Duchy of Anhalt